The Korea Hockey Association is the governing body of field hockey in South Korea. It is affiliated to IHF International Hockey Federation and AHF Asian Hockey Federation. The headquarters of the federation are in Seoul, South Korea.

Lee Sang-hyun is the President of the Korea Hockey Association and Park Shin Heum is the General Secretary.

See also
 South Korea men's national field hockey team
 South Korea women's national field hockey team

References

External links
 Korea Hockey Association

South Korea
Hockey
Field hockey in South Korea